Panorama is a municipality in the state of São Paulo in Brazil. The population is 15,862 (2020 est.) in an area of 356 km2. The elevation is 276 m.

References

Municipalities in São Paulo (state)